"Snoopafella" is a song by American rapper Snoop Dogg, taken from Snoop Dogg's fourth studio album No Limit Top Dogg (1999). The song was written by Snoop Dogg, with production handled by Ant Banks. The song heavily samples "Cinderfella Dana Dane" by Dana Dane, which in turn heavily samples "Dazz" by Brick.

Charts

References

1999 songs
Snoop Dogg songs
Songs written by Snoop Dogg
G-funk songs